Zafar Hayat (born 31 March 1927) is a Pakistani field hockey player. He competed in the men's tournament at the 1964 Summer Olympics, and was part of the team that won the silver medal.

References

External links
 

1927 births
Possibly living people
Pakistani male field hockey players
Olympic field hockey players of Pakistan
Field hockey players at the 1964 Summer Olympics
Place of birth missing (living people)
Olympic silver medalists for Pakistan
Olympic medalists in field hockey
Medalists at the 1964 Summer Olympics
Asian Games medalists in field hockey
Asian Games gold medalists for Pakistan
Medalists at the 1962 Asian Games
Field hockey players at the 1962 Asian Games
20th-century Pakistani people